Costa Rica competed at the 1972 Summer Olympics in Munich, West Germany. Three competitors, all men, took part in four events in three sports.

Athletics

Men's 10,000 metres
 Rafael Ángel Pérez 
 Round 1 — 29:36.6 min (→ 13th in heat, did not advance)

Judo

Men's Half-Heavyweight
Roberto Solorzano

Shooting

One shooter represented Costa Rica in 1972.

50 m rifle, three positions
 Hugo Chamberlain

50 m rifle, prone
 Hugo Chamberlain

References

External links
Official Olympic Reports

Nations at the 1972 Summer Olympics
1972 Summer Olympics
1972 in Costa Rica